Kadaba is a taluk of Dakshina Kannada  District of Karnataka, India. It is located 82 km towards East from District headquarters Mangalore, 31 km from Puttur, 38 km from Sullia and 272 km from State capital Bangalore.

Etymology 
As per the locals, Kadaba was ruled by 'Kadamba' dynasty hence the name 'Kadaba'. However, there are no valid evidence proving the same. As per the Historians Kadaba had been called Kadamma (Kadave, a male deer) since the animals were found in large number here in the past. The main languages are Tulu, Kannada, Hindi, Malayalam, Beary.
Kadaba taluk is the place where all religions are free to practice their rituals.
During the festivals all religion people gather in the temples, churches and mosques and worship and show harmony.

History 

The demand for Taluk status for Kadaba was first raised by 'Kadaba Taluk Rachana Horata Samiti' and people of Kadaba in 1961. B.M Hundekar taluk re-organisation committee, in its recommendations in 1985, had suggested the formation of Kadaba taluk. Later, the Gaddigowdar Committee had also recommended the same. The government had appointed a special Tahsildar for Kadaba in 2001. However, in 2009, the Taluk reconstitution committee under the chairmanship of M.B Prakash had excluded Kadaba in its recommendations.

Local leaders and well wishers continued the demand for Kadaba Taluk under 'Kadaba Taluk Rachana Horata Samiti' president C.C Philip and Vice President Kushalappa Gowda resulting in the formation of new Taluk on 1 January 2018 followed by official inauguration on 8 March 2019 by Karnataka Revenue Minister R.V. Deshpande and Karnataka Urban Development & DK District In-charge Minister U.T. Khader.

In 2013, then ruling BJP government under Chief Minister Jagadish Shettar had declared Kadaba as Taluk along with Moodbidri of Dakshin Kannada District and Byndoor and Brahmavar of Udupi district. On 15 March 2017, Karnataka government under Chief Minister Siddaramaiah has re-declared Kadaba as Taluk again and from 1 January 2018 it is officially functioning as Taluk headquarters. Kadaba taluk is carved out of Puttur and Sullia taluks and the new taluk comprises nine villages from Puttur taluk and seven villages of Sullia. The creation of Kadaba taluk will benefit the people who have been travelling 65 km to the Puttur taluk office to get any work done. Now, the people of Subramnya, Nelyadi, Shiradi can reach the taluk head office by travelling a distance of only 10 to 20 km.
Many local politicians and leader's who stood as backbone to taluk fight namely C.C. Chacko (late), Syed Meehra shaib, Raja Rathna ariga, Naryan Bhat, Balakrishnan Ballery, Nirinjan Ariga, Balakrishnan Bhat, Dr. Mallya, S Abdul Khader, Thomson K.T, Ram Bhat, Roy Abraham, Vijay Kumar Rai, P.P Varghese, Krishna Shetty, C.P. Simon, Seetha Ram Gowda and many other political leaders and businessman have supported in Taluk formation.

Education 
Kadaba has Schools and Colleges in and around though Professional colleges are yet to start in Kadaba. Govt. Primary, High Schools and PU College and St. Joachims Institutions (founded in 1926) are the oldest schools of Kadaba. Other English medium schools are also popular here.
Apart from promises from different governments, Kadaba is yet to be sanctioned with a Government First Grade college.

However, in Oct. 2017, then Chief Minister Siddaramaih laid the foundation stone for the veterinary college at Koila to be built under the management of Karnataka Veterinary, Animal and Fisheries Sciences University. The college campus comprising veterinary hospital, college, hostel and farm will be spread in 247 acres of land and hopes to improve animal resource in the State. Karnataka Government has plans to develop Koila veterinary college as a breeding center for cattle along with preservation of local varieties of cattle such as Malenadu Gidda.

Pilgrimage and Tourism 
Famous Pilgrimage places like Kukke Subramanya and Dharmasthala are easily accessible from Kadaba.

Pilgrim Centers

There are few pilgrim centers around Kadaba, which made its existence through regular visits by tourists every year.
Sri.

Tourist Attractions

 Kumara Parvatha: This place is famous for trekking, where number of trekkers visits every year. The panoramic view of Western Ghat seals the heart of people who make an attempt to clinch the top of mountain.
 Yenmmoor, a historical martial arts center, Garodi in tulu language.
 Western ghats (Shiraadi) : This place is famous for thrilling cave drive. The enchanting view of western ghats, gushing sound of river, chirping of birds and roaring of animals enthrals visitors.

Agriculture and Economy 
Commercial Crops: 
Arecanut, Rubber, Pepper, Cocoa, Coconut and Cashew plantations are the source of income for this region. Acres of Arecanut and Rubber plantations are the common view, which has boosted the economy and lifestyle of people. The Kumaradhara River is the main source of water for growing crops. The CPCRI Kidu farm one of Asia's biggest Coconut farm is located at Nettana, Kadaba taluk.

Research institutes

 Central Plantation Crops Research Institute (CPCRI) Kidu, Nettana.
 Rubber Research Center, Kombar, Nettana.
 Karnataka Forest Development Corporation (KFDC), Nettana.
 Central Forest Depot, Nettana.
 Government Veterinary Institute, Koila.

Transportation 

Kadaba can be reached either through Road or Rail, the nearest Railway Station is Kodimbala.
Subrahmanya Road railway station (Nettana), the second biggest station after Mangalore Central is in Kadaba Taluk. This station connects to Mangalore, Bangalore, Mysore, Karwar and Kannur.
Mangalore (Bajpe) is the nearest Airport.

See also 
 Puttur, Karnataka
 Belthangady
 Nelliyadi
 Sullia
 Sakleshpur
 Somvarpet

References 

Cities and towns in Dakshina Kannada district